The 2022 Maryland Senate election were held on November 8, 2022, to elect senators in all 47 districts of the Maryland Senate. Members were elected in single-member constituencies to four-year terms. These elections were held concurrently with various federal and state elections, including for Governor of Maryland. The Democratic and Republican primaries were held on July 19, 2022.

Democrats flipped two seats in the Baltimore metropolitan area, which gave them control over 70% of the seats in the chamber. However, Republicans did perform about 4% better as compared to 2018.

Background 

The Democratic Party had held majority control of the Senate since the beginning of the 20th century. The closest that the Republican Party had come to gaining control since then was in 1918, when Democrats held a thin 14 to 13 majority. Although Republicans had controlled the governorship since 2015, Democrats maintained a veto-proof supermajority of three-fifths in the 2014 and 2018 elections.

In the 2022 elections, Governor Larry Hogan was term-limited and Democrats assembled a large field of candidates to reclaim the office. The party retained their majority in the General Assembly and successfully retook the governor's office, and re-established a government trifecta.

Predictions

Overview

Summary by district

Closest races 
Seats where the margin of victory was under 10%:

Retiring incumbents

Democrats 
 District 3: Ronald N. Young is retiring.
 District 10: Delores G. Kelley is retiring.
 District 26: Obie Patterson is retiring.

Republicans 
 District 1: George C. Edwards is retiring.
 District 4: Michael Hough is retiring to run for Frederick County executive.
 District 33: Edward R. Reilly is retiring.
 District 34: Robert Cassilly is retiring to run for Harford County executive.

Incumbents defeated

In primary elections

Republicans
 District 37: Adelaide Eckardt lost renomination to Johnny Mautz.

Detailed results

District 1 

The new 1st district encompasses all of Garrett and Allegany counties and west Washington County. Four-term Republican incumbent George C. Edwards, who was re-elected in 2018 with 98.3% of the vote, announced on July 14, 2021, that he would not run for re-election to a fifth term.

Republican primary 
Maryland Matters has identified the Republican primary election in District 1 as a "race to watch".

General election

District 2 

The new 2nd district encompasses east Washington County, including Hagerstown, and north Frederick County. Republican incumbent Paul D. Corderman is running for a full term after being appointed to the seat on September 1, 2020, following the resignation of Andrew A. Serafini, who was re-elected in 2018 with 71.7% of the vote.

District 3 

The new 3rd district encompasses the city of Frederick. Three-term Democratic incumbent Ronald N. Young, who was re-elected in 2018 with 58.5% of the vote, announced on November 8, 2021, that he would not run for re-election to a fourth term.

Democratic primary 
Maryland Matters has identified the Democratic primary election in District 3 as a "race to watch".

General election

District 4 

The new 4th district encompasses most of Frederick County. Two-term Republican incumbent Michael Hough, who was re-elected in 2018 with 59.1% of the vote, announced on May 17, 2021, that he would run for Frederick County executive instead of seeking a third term.

Republican primary

General election

District 5 

The new 5th district encompasses most of Carroll County, including Eldersburg and Westminster. Two-term Republican incumbent Justin Ready, who was re-elected in 2018 with 71.5% of the vote, is running for a third term unopposed.

District 6 

The new 6th district encompasses southeast Baltimore County, including Dundalk, Essex, and Edgemere. Two-term Republican incumbent Johnny Ray Salling, who was re-elected in 2018 with 55.3% of the vote, is running for a third term.

Republican primary

Democratic primary

General election

District 7 

The new 7th district runs along the border of Baltimore and Harford counties. Three-term Republican incumbent J. B. Jennings, who was re-elected in 2018 with 66.9% of the vote, is running for a fourth term unopposed.

District 8 

The new 8th district consists of part of Baltimore County, including Perry Hall and Parkville. Five-term Democratic incumbent Katherine A. Klausmeier, who was re-elected in 2018 with 51.1% of the vote, is running for a sixth term.

Democratic primary

General election

District 9 

The new 9th district encompasses north Howard county, including Ellicott City and Clarksville, and Damascus in Prince George's County. First-term Democratic incumbent Katie Fry Hester, who was elected in 2018 with 50.8% of the vote, is running for a second term.

District 10 

The new 10th district encompasses east Baltimore County, including Randallstown and Reisterstown. Seven-term Democratic incumbent Delores G. Kelley, who was re-elected in 2018 with 80.3% of the vote, announced on December 13, 2021, that she would not run for re-election to an eighth term.

Democratic primary 
Maryland Matters has identified the Democratic primary election in District 10 as a "race to watch".

General election

District 11 

The new 11th district encompasses central Baltimore County, including Owings Mills, Pikesville, and Mays Chapel. Democratic incumbent Shelly L. Hettleman is running for a full term after being appointed to the seat on February 3, 2020, following the resignation of Robert Zirkin, who was re-elected in 2018 with 96.9% of the vote.

District 12 

The new 12th district encompasses parts of Howard and Anne Arundel counties, including Columbia, Brooklyn Park, and part of Glen Burnie. First-term Democratic incumbent Clarence K. Lam, who was elected in 2018 with 66.1% of the vote, is running for a second term.

Republican primary

General election

District 13 

The new 13th district encompasses south Howard County. Two-term Democratic incumbent Guy Guzzone, who was re-elected in 2018 with 97.4% of the vote, is running for a third term unopposed.

District 14 

The new 14th district runs along the border of Howard and Montgomery counties, including Olney. First-term Democratic incumbent Craig Zucker, who was elected in 2018 with 72.6% of the vote, is running for a second term.

Democratic primary

General election

District 15 

The new 15th district encompasses east Montgomery County, including North Potomac and parts of Germantown. Two-term Democratic incumbent Brian Feldman, who was re-elected in 2018 with 72.0% of the vote, is running for a third term.

District 16 

The new 16th district consists of south Montgomery County, including Potomac and parts of Bethesda. Two-term Democratic incumbent Susan C. Lee, who was re-elected in 2018 with 80.1% of the vote, is running for a third term unopposed.

District 17 

The new 17th district consists of Rockville and Gaithersburg. Two-term Democratic incumbent Cheryl Kagan, who was re-elected in 2018 with 79.0% of the vote, is running for a third term.

District 18 

The new 18th district consists of Bethesda, Chevy Chase, Wheaton, and Kensington. First-term Democratic incumbent Jeff Waldstreicher, who was elected in 2018 with 97.6% of the vote, is running for a second term.

Democratic primary 
Maryland Matters has identified the Democratic primary election in District 18 as a "race to watch".

General election

District 19 

The new 19th district includes Aspen Hill, Leisure World, and Redland. First-term Democratic incumbent Benjamin F. Kramer, who was elected in 2018 with 88.0% of the vote, is running for a second term.

Raul Ayala won the Republican primary, but declined the nomination. The Montgomery County Republican Central Committee consequently nominated Anita Cox to run against Kramer in the general election.

Republican primary

General election

District 20 

The new 20th district includes Silver Spring, White Oak, and Takoma Park. First-term Democratic incumbent William C. Smith Jr., who was elected in 2018 with 90.8% of the vote, is running for a second term.

Democratic primary

General election

District 21 

The new 21st district includes parts of Prince George's and Anne Arundel counties, including College Park, Laurel, and Beltsville. Four-term Democratic incumbent James Rosapepe, who was re-elected in 2018 with 77.5% of the vote, is running for a fifth term.

District 22 

The new 22nd district consists of Hyattsville, Greenbelt, and Riverdale Park. Seven-term Democratic incumbent Paul G. Pinsky, who was re-elected in 2018 with 92.4% of the vote, is running for an eighth term.

Democratic primary

General election

District 23 

The new 23rd district runs along the border of Prince George's and Anne Arundel counties, including Upper Marlboro, Bowie, and South Laurel. Democratic incumbent Ron Watson is running for a full term after being appointed to the seat on August 31, 2021, following the resignation of Douglas J. J. Peters, who was re-elected in 2018 with 98.6% of the vote.

Democratic primary 
Maryland Matters has identified the Democratic primary election in District 23 as a "race to watch".

General election

District 24 

The new 24th district consists of Seat Pleasant, Springdale, and Lake Arbor. Three-term Democratic incumbent Joanne C. Benson, who was re-elected in 2018 with 99.2% of the vote, is running for a fourth term unopposed.

District 25 

The new 25th district consists of Forestville, Westphalia, and Kettering. First-term Democratic incumbent Melony G. Griffith, who was elected in 2018 with 99.4% of the vote, is running for a second term.

Democratic primary

General election

District 26 

The new 26th district consists of Friendly, Oxon Hill, and Fort Washington. First-term Democratic incumbent Obie Patterson, who was elected in 2018 with 92.5% of the vote, announced on April 6, 2022, that he would not seek re-election to a second term.

Democratic primary

General election

District 27 

The new 27th district consists of parts of Calvert, Charles, and Prince George's counties, including Chesapeake Beach and Waldorf. Democratic incumbent Michael Jackson is running for a full term after being appointed to the seat on January 13, 2021, following the resignation of former President of the Maryland Senate Thomas V. Miller Jr., who was re-elected in 2018 with 66.0% of the vote.

Democratic primary

Republican primary

General election

District 28 

The new 28th district encompasses most of Charles County. First-term Democratic incumbent Arthur Ellis, who was elected in 2018 with 66.2% of the vote, is running for a second term.

Democratic primary 
Maryland Matters has identified the Democratic primary election in District 28 as a "race to watch".

General election

District 29 

The new 29th district encompasses all of St. Mary's County and south Calvert County. First-term Republican incumbent Jack Bailey, who was elected in 2018 with 60.2% of the vote, is running for a second term unopposed.

District 30 

The new 30th district encompasses south Anne Arundel County, including the state capital, Annapolis. First-term Democratic incumbent Sarah K. Elfreth, who was elected in 2018 with 53.8% of the vote, is running for a second term.

Republican primary

General election

District 31 

The new 31st district encompasses north Anne Arundel County, including Pasadena, Severn, and Gambrills. Four-term Republican incumbent Bryan Simonaire, who was re-elected in 2018 with 61.0% of the vote, is running for a fifth term.

District 32 

The new 32nd district encompasses part of north Anne Arundel County, including Glen Burnie and Fort Meade. First-term Democratic incumbent Pamela Beidle, who was elected in 2018 with 66.4% of the vote, is running for a second term.

Democratic primary 
Maryland Matters has identified the Democratic primary election in District 32 as a "race to watch".

General election

District 33 

The new 33rd district encompasses central Anne Arundel County, including Cape St. Claire, Severna Park, Odenton, and Crofton. Three-term Republican incumbent Edward R. Reilly, who was re-elected in 2018 with 53.5% of the vote, initially filed to run for re-election, but announced on April 18, 2022, that he would not seek re-election to a fourth term.

District 34 

The new 34th district encompasses south Harford County, including Aberdeen, Edgewood, and Havre de Grace. Two-term incumbent Robert Cassilly, who was re-elected in 2018 with 50.1% of the vote, announced on April 28, 2021, that he would run for Harford County executive instead of seeking a third term.

Maryland Matters has identified both the Democratic and Republican primary elections in District 34 as a "race to watch".

Republican primary

Democratic primary

General election

District 35 

The new 35th district encompasses north Harford and Cecil counties, including Rising Sun, North East, and Castleton. First-term Republican incumbent Jason C. Gallion, who was elected in 2018 with 67.3% of the vote, is running for a second term.

Republican primary

General election

District 36 

The new 36th district encompasses all of Kent and Queen Anne's counties, and parts of Cecil and Caroline counties, including Elkton. Two-term Republican incumbent Stephen S. Hershey Jr., who was re-elected in 2018 with 65.1% of the vote, is running for a third term.

Republican primary

General election

District 37 

The new 37th district encompasses all of Talbot and Dorchester counties, and parts of Caroline and Wicomico counties, including Cambridge, Easton, Federalsburg, and parts of Salisbury. Two-term Republican incumbent Adelaide C. Eckardt, who was re-elected in 2018 with 59.9% of the vote, is running for a third term.

Republican primary 
Maryland Matters has identified the Republican primary election in District 37 as a "race to watch".

General election

District 38 

The new 38th district encompasses all of Worcester and Somerset counties, and part of Wicomico County, including Ocean City, Pocomoke City, Princess Anne, and part of Salisbury. First-term Republican incumbent Mary Beth Carozza, who was elected in 2018 with 52.6% of the vote, is running for a second term.

District 39 

The new 39th district includes Montgomery Village and parts of Germantown and Clarksburg. Three-term Democratic incumbent Nancy J. King, who was re-elected in 2018 with 79.3% of the vote, is running for a fourth term.

Democratic primary

General election

District 40 

The new 40th district encompasses communities in west Baltimore, including Morrell Park, Sandtown-Winchester, and Greenspring. First-term Democratic incumbent Antonio Hayes, who was elected in 2018 with 98.7% of the vote, is running for a second term.

District 41 

The new 41st district encompasses communities in west Baltimore, including Wyndhurst, Yale Heights, and Edmondson. First-term Democratic incumbent Jill P. Carter, who was elected in 2018 with 98.2% of the vote, is running for a second term unopposed.

District 42 

The new 42nd district encompasses north Baltimore County, including Timonium, Parkton, and Hereford. First-term Republican incumbent Chris West, who was elected in 2018 with 51.0% of the vote, is running for a second term.

Republican primary

General election

District 43 

The new 43rd district encompasses parts of central Baltimore County and Baltimore, including Towson, Waverly, and Cameron Village. First-term Democratic incumbent Mary L. Washington, who was elected in 2018 with 98.8% of the vote, is running for a second term.

District 44 

The new 44th district encompasses parts of southwest Baltimore County surrounding Baltimore, including Woodlawn, Catonsville, and Landsowne. Democratic incumbent Charles E. Sydnor III is running for a full term after being appointed to the seat on January 8, 2020, following the resignation of Shirley Nathan-Pulliam, who was re-elected in 2018 with 84.5% of the vote.

Democratic primary

General election

District 45 

The new 45th district encompasses neighborhoods in central and east Baltimore, including Broadway East, Frankford, and Armistead Gardens. First-term Democratic incumbent Cory V. McCray, who was elected in 2018 with 98.8% of the vote, is running for a second term unopposed.

District 46 

The new 46th district encompasses neighborhoods in central and south Baltimore, including the Inner Harbor, Bayview, and Curtis Bay. Three-term Democratic incumbent and President of the Maryland Senate Bill Ferguson, who was re-elected in 2018 with 78.2% of the vote, is running for a fourth term.

District 47 

The new 47th district encompasses parts of Prince George's County, including Chillum, Cheverly, and Landover. First-term Democratic incumbent Malcolm Augustine, who was elected in 2018 with 93.0% of the vote, is running for a second term.

Democratic primary

General election

Notes

See also
 Elections in Maryland
 2022 United States elections
 2022 Maryland gubernatorial election
 2022 Maryland Attorney General election
 2022 United States Senate election in Maryland
 2022 Maryland Comptroller election
 2022 United States House of Representatives elections in Maryland
 2022 United States gubernatorial elections
 2022 Maryland House of Delegates election

References 

Senate
Maryland Senate
Maryland Senate elections